Victoria Azarenka was the defending champion, but she was already participating in the women's tournament.

Anastasia Pavlyuchenkova defeated Caroline Wozniacki (1–6, 6–2, 6–3) in the final.

Seeds

Draw

Finals

Top half

Section 1

Section 2

Bottom half

Section 3

Section 4

Sources
Draw 

Girls' Singles
Australian Open, 2006 Girls' Singles